The Frumoasa Monastery is a Romanian Orthodox monastery located in Iași, Romania. 

Built between 1726 and 1733, by Moldavian Prince Grigore II Ghica, the monastery is listed in the National Register of Historic Monuments.

References

External links

 Churches and monasteries in Iași at Iași City Hall website

Romanian Orthodox monasteries of Iași County
Romanian Orthodox churches in Iași
Historic monuments in Iași County
Christian monasteries established in the 18th century
1733 establishments in the Ottoman Empire
18th-century establishments in Moldavia
1733 establishments in Romania
Neoclassical church buildings in Romania
18th-century architecture in Romania